Middlemore is a suburb of the former Manukau City, one of the four cities that made up the conurbation of Auckland, in northern New Zealand, until 2010.

The suburb is located on flat land at the southern end of the Ōtāhuhu isthmus, at the end of an arm of the Tamaki River and 18 kilometres southeast of Auckland city centre. It is located on State Highway 1, and the North Island Main Trunk railway passes by the Middlemore Hospital.

Middlemore's most well-known landmarks are Middlemore Hospital and the Auckland Golf Club course, which surrounds the hospital grounds. Adjacent to both the golf club and Otahuhu College is the private secondary school, King's College.

History 
The name 'Middlemore' refers to a region that was once known as Kohuora and was farmed beginning in the 1840s by William Thorne Buckland, who was joined by his younger brother, Alfred Buckland, in 1850. the Middlemore name came from a home that was originally owned by Richard Fairburn, the son of Anglican missionary William Thomas Fairburn, the house is now a part of the nearby Auckland Golf Club clubhouse.

The suburb of Middlemore sits on the previous site of the Waokauri / Pūkaki portage, which allowed overland connections for canoes between the Waitematā and Manukau harbours.

Demographics

Middlemore had a population of 33 at the 2018 New Zealand census, a decrease of 72 people (−68.6%) since the 2013 census, and a decrease of 240 people (−87.9%) since the 2006 census. There were 18 males and 15 females, giving a sex ratio of 1.2 males per female. The median age was 44.9 years (compared with 37.4 years nationally), with 6 people (18.2%) aged under 15 years, 3 (9.1%) aged 15 to 29, 15 (45.5%) aged 30 to 64, and 9 (27.3%) aged 65 or older.

Ethnicities were 63.6% European/Pākehā, 18.2% Māori, 27.3% Pacific peoples, and 18.2% Asian. People may identify with more than one ethnicity.

The percentage of people born overseas was 27.3, compared with 27.1% nationally.

Although some people chose not to answer the census's question about religious affiliation, 27.3% had no religion, 54.5% were Christian, and 9.1% were Hindu.

Of those at least 15 years old, 3 (11.1%) people had a bachelor's or higher degree, and 3 (11.1%) people had no formal qualifications. The median income was $21,900, compared with $31,800 nationally. 3 people (11.1%) earned over $70,000 compared to 17.2% nationally. The employment status of those at least 15 was that 9 (33.3%) people were employed full-time.

References

External links
Photographs of Middlemore held in Auckland Libraries' heritage collections.

Ōtara-Papatoetoe Local Board Area
Suburbs of Auckland
Populated places on the Tāmaki River